Cook & Becker is a Dutch online art dealership specializing in digital art, videogame art and concept art. Founded in 2011, the company is known for its fine art prints and art books of popular videogames like Journey, Mass Effect, The Last of Us and Ōkami.

Overview 
Cook & Becker was founded in 2011 by brothers Maarten and Ruben Brands, with the intention of creating a more prominent position in the contemporary art world for the artists in the games industry that shape a big part of contemporary visual culture. It has since acquired the rights to produce prints for many popular video games, including The Witcher, Mass Effect, Uncharted 4: A Thief's End, The Last of Us, Ōkami, Destiny, Bioshock: Infinite, Battlefield and Dark Souls.

In October 2011, Cook & Becker organized its first exhibit at Art.Fair/Blooom!, a contemporary art fair in Cologne, Germany.Cook & Becker Exhibits at 2011 Art.Fair/Blooom!. Candb.com. (15 November 2011). Retrieved on 2017-01-29.

In November 2014, Cook & Becker co-organized the New Horizons exhibition at the Fries Museum's second Next Gen Art Event in Leeuwarden, The Netherlands. This exhibition featured the work of various videogame studios, including a touring collection of Naughty Dog artworks spanning 30 years of game development.

In 2015, Cook & Becker released a line of prints based on SEGA retro games with all new artwork by notable artists.This Jet Set Radio print is unreal. Destructoid (15 May 2015). Retrieved 2017-01-26. 2015 Also saw the launch of their first art book, Killzone Visual Design, based on the Killzone series by developer Guerrilla Games. This release was followed in 2016 by the art book 120 Years of Vlambeer & Friends. Bringing back arcade since 1896, about indie game studio Vlambeer.Vlambeer viert jubileum met boek. De Telegraaf (11 August 2016). Retrieved on 2017-01-28. An official Sonic the Hedgehog art book, Sonic the Hedgehog 25th Anniversary Art Book, which chronicles the series' origin and evolution, was released in April 2017.Relive your gaming youth with these nostalgic images from Sonic the Hedgehog's anniversary book. Wired UK (no date). Retrieved on 2017-01-26.

 Videogame art books 
 Killzone Visual Design (hc, 208 pages, 2015)
 120 Years of Vlambeer and Friends. Bringing back arcade games since 1896 (pb, 176 pages, 2016)
 Sonic the Hedgehog 25th Anniversary Art Book (hc, 248 pages, 2017)
 The Art & Design of FINAL FANTASY XV'' (hc, 220 pages, 2017)

References

External links 
 

Companies established in 2011
Digital art
Video game art
Companies based in Amsterdam
Dutch companies established in 2011